Studding-Sail Bend is a way to attach the end of a rope at right angle to a cylindrical object such as a beam.

Tying
 wrap the end two or more times around the object
 make the end hook around the standing part and under all wrappings, to come out by the last wrap
 make the end turn back and cross over the wrappings, to tuck/pass it under the first wrap

Halyard bend may be considered to be the "double-loop-around, and single-tuck-under" version of timber hitch which itself is usually tied as "single-loop-around, and double-tuck-under".

See also
List of knots

References

External links

Bend knots